Hemidactylus macropholis, also known as Boulenger's gecko or largescale leaf-toed gecko,  is a species of gecko. It is endemic to northeastern Africa and occurs in Somalia, northern Kenya, Ethiopia, and Eritrea,.

References

Hemidactylus
Vertebrates of Eritrea
Reptiles of Ethiopia
Reptiles of Kenya
Reptiles of Somalia
Reptiles described in 1896
Taxa named by George Albert Boulenger